In classical antiquity, a crotalum (κρόταλον krotalon) was a kind of clapper or castanet used in religious dances by groups in ancient Greece and elsewhere, including the Korybantes.

The term has been erroneously supposed by some writers to be the same as the sistrum. These mistakes are refuted at length by Friedrich Adolph Lampe (1683–1729) in De cymbalis veterum. From the Suda and the Scholiast on Aristophanes (Nubes, 260), it appears to have been a split reed or cane, which clattered when shaken with the hand. According to Eustathius (Il. XI.160), it was made of shell and brass, as well as wood. Clement of Alexandria attributes the instruments invention to the Sicilians, and forbids the use thereof to the Christians, because of the motions and gestures accompanying the practice.

Women who played on the crotalum were termed crotalistriae. Such was Virgil's Copa (2),

Crispum sub crotalo docta movere latus.

This line alludes to the dance with crotala (similar to castanets), for which we have the additional testimony of Macrobius (Saturnalia III.14.4‑8).

As the instrument made a noise somewhat like that of a crane's bill, the bird was called crotalistria, "player on crotala".

Pausanias affirms by way of the epic poet Pisander of Camirus that Heracles did not kill the birds of Lake Stymphalia, but that he drove them away by playing on crotala. Based on this, the instrument must be exceedingly ancient.

The word krotalon is often applied, by an easy metaphor, to a noisy talkative person (Aristoph. Nub. 448; Eurip. Cycl. 104).

References

Ancient Greek musical instruments
Ancient Roman culture
Greek musical instruments
European percussion instruments